Antsoatany is a town and commune in Madagascar. It belongs to the district of Antsirabe II, which is a part of Vakinankaratra Region. The population of the commune was estimated to be approximately 10,000 in 2001 commune census.

Only primary schooling is available. The majority 97% of the population of the commune are farmers, while an additional 3% receives their livelihood from raising livestock. The most important crops are maize and rice, while other important agricultural products are beans and potatoes.

References and notes 

Populated places in Vakinankaratra